Calcio 2000 was a monthly Italian football magazine reporting on all aspects of Italian and European football. The magazine was published by Action Group Editore. In October 2020 the magazine became online-only publication.

History and profile
Calcio 2000 was first published in August 1997 as a monthly magazine. The founding editor-in-chief was Marino Bartoletti.

Written in Italian, it reports on football in Serie A, Serie B, Serie C1 and Serie C2. It also reports on how the other famous European teams are doing; and what happened in Premier League, La Liga, Bundesliga and Ligue 1. It also presents news on Italian teams in European competitions and there is sometimes special editions about clubs.

References

External links
  

1997 establishments in Italy
2020 establishments in Italy
Association football magazines
Defunct magazines published in Italy
Italian-language magazines
Magazines established in 1997
Magazines disestablished in 2020
Mass media in Brescia
Monthly magazines published in Italy
Online magazines with defunct print editions